Pleioceras is a genus of plants in the family Apocynaceae, first described as a genus in 1888. It is native to tropical Africa.

Species
 Pleioceras afzelii (K.Schum.) Stapf - Guinea, Sierra Leone, Liberia 
 Pleioceras barteri Baill. - Sierra Leone, Liberia, Ghana, Ivory Coast, Nigeria, Benin, Cameroon  
 Pleioceras gilletii Stapf  - Nigeria, Republic of Congo, Zaire, Angola 
 Pleioceras orientale Vollesen - Kenya, Tanzania, Mozambique 
 Pleioceras zenkeri Stapf - Nigeria, Gabon, Cameroon

References

 
Flora of Africa
Apocynaceae genera
Taxonomy articles created by Polbot
Taxa named by Henri Ernest Baillon